Trigonistis anticlina is a species of moth in the family Noctuidae. It is endemic to New Zealand. Adults of this species inhabit dense native forest habitat in ravines.

Taxonomy 
It was described by Edward Meyrick in 1901 using two specimens collected from Wellington by George Hudson. This species was initially confused with the Australian species Hyperaucha octias (now known as Lithilaria proestans) however Meyrick corrected his and Hudson's error. Hudson discussed and illustrated this species in his 1928 book The butterflies and moths of New Zealand.  In 1988 John S. Dugdale assigned this species to the genus Trigonistis. The syntype specimens are held at the Natural History Museum, London.

Description 
This species was described by Meyrick as follows:

Distribution 
This species is endemic to New Zealand. It is found in the North Island and the north of the South Island. This species has been found to occur in and around National Park, Ohakune, Taihape, and its type locality of Wellington. It has also been collected at Dawson's Falls at Egmont National Park.

Behaviour 
T. anticlina is on the wing from October to December.

Habitat and hosts 

This species prefers dense forested ravine habitat. It can be found amongst dead leaf litter or fern fronds. The adults of the species has been found to be resident in leaf litter of kanuka (Kunzea ericoides) forest. Larvae are suspected to feed on native leaf litter or fungi.

References

External links

 Trigonistis anticlina in species id

Moths described in 1901
Moths of New Zealand
Hypeninae
Endemic fauna of New Zealand
Taxa named by Edward Meyrick
Endemic moths of New Zealand